Betsy Robertson Eyre  (née Walter, 28 November 1911 – 17 January 1983) was a New Zealand teacher, community worker and local politician. She was born in Nelson, New Zealand, on 28 November 1911.

In the 1967 New Year Honours, Eyre was appointed a Member of the Order of the British Empire, for services to the community and local government.

References

1911 births
1983 deaths
Deputy mayors of places in New Zealand
Nelson City Councillors
New Zealand educators
New Zealand social workers
People from Nelson, New Zealand
People educated at Nelson College for Girls
New Zealand Members of the Order of the British Empire
20th-century New Zealand politicians
20th-century New Zealand women politicians